Andrea Mitchell (born October 30, 1946) is an American television journalist, anchor and commentator for NBC News, based in Washington, D.C.

She is NBC News' chief foreign affairs & chief Washington correspondent, reporting on the 2008 presidential election campaign for NBC News broadcasts, including NBC Nightly News with Lester Holt, Today and MSNBC. She anchors Andrea Mitchell Reports, which airs from noon to 1 p.m. ET weekdays on MSNBC. Mitchell has both appeared on and guest hosted Meet the Press. She was also often a guest on Hardball with Chris Matthews and The Rachel Maddow Show.

In 2019, Mitchell earned a Lifetime Achievement Emmy for her journalistic work.

Early life, education, and early career
Mitchell was raised in a Jewish family, in New Rochelle, New York, the daughter of Cecile and Sydney (Rubenstein) Mitchell. Her father was the chief executive officer and partial owner of a furniture manufacturing company in Manhattan. He was also the president of Beth El Synagogue in New Rochelle for 40 years. Her mother was an administrator at the New York Institute of Technology in Manhattan. Her brother Arthur and his wife, Nancy Mitchell, moved to British Columbia in the 1970s. He has dual American and Canadian citizenship, becoming a member of the Legislative Assembly of Yukon and the leader of the Yukon Liberal Party in the 2000s.

Mitchell is a graduate of New Rochelle High School. She went on to attend the University of Pennsylvania, where she received a Bachelor of Arts degree in English literature in 1967. While at Penn, she served as news director of student radio station WXPN. Staying in Philadelphia after graduation, she was hired as a reporter at KYW radio. She rose to prominence as the station's City Hall correspondent during the Mayor Frank Rizzo’s administration and also reported for sister station KYW-TV.

She moved in 1976 to CBS-affiliate WTOP (now WUSA) in Washington, D.C. Two years later, Mitchell moved to NBC's network news operation, where she served as a general correspondent. In 1979, she was named NBC News' energy correspondent and reported on the late-1970s energy crisis and the Three Mile Island nuclear accident. Mitchell also covered the White House from 1981 until becoming chief congressional correspondent in 1988.

NBC News and MSNBC

Mitchell has been with NBC News since late July 1978. She has been its chief foreign affairs correspondent since November 1994. Previously, she served as chief White House correspondent (1993–1994) and chief Congressional correspondent (1988–1992).

In 2005, Mitchell's book,Talking Back... to Presidents, Dictators, and Assorted Scoundrels,, was published. It chronicles her work as a journalist.

Since 2008, Mitchell has hosted Andrea Mitchell Reports, her program on MSNBC.

Controversies

Plame affair
A report in The Washington Post ("Bush Administration Is Focus of Inquiry CIA Agent's Identity Was Leaked to Media" by Mike Allen and Dana Priest, The Washington Post, September 28, 2003) that Mitchell had leaked Valerie Plame's identity led to her being questioned by the Federal Bureau of Investigation. While Mitchell never appeared before the investigating grand jury or in I. Lewis Libby's trial, she was on the subpoena list as a person of interest.

In October 2003, on the Capitol Report, Mitchell made a statement which Libby's defense construed to mean it was widely known among journalists that Joe Wilson's wife was in the Central Intelligence Agency (CIA), a position she later clarified by answering the question of how widely known it was in Washington that Wilson's wife worked for the CIA: "It was widely known amongst those of us who cover the intelligence community and who were actively engaged in trying to track down who among the foreign service community was the envoy to Niger. But, frankly, I wasn't aware of her actual role at the CIA, and the fact that she had a covert role involving weapons of mass destruction, not until Bob Novak wrote it."

Sudanese incident
During a July 2005 news conference in Khartoum, Mitchell was forcibly ejected from a room after asking Sudanese President Omar al-Bashir some pointed questions. They included: "Can you tell us why the violence is continuing?" (referring to genocide in Sudan's Darfur province) and "Can you tell us why the government is supporting the militias?" "Why should Americans believe your promises?"  At this point two armed security guards grabbed her and forcibly shoved her out of the room.

After the incident Mitchell said, "It is our job to ask. They can always say 'no comment'... but to drag a reporter out just for asking is inexcusable behavior."

Prior to the incident, Sudanese officials expressed reservations about allowing American newspaper or television reporters to join the Sudanese press pool.  Sean McCormack, the State Department's assistant secretary for public affairs, said to his Sudanese counterpart, "I'll convey your desires about not permitting reporters to ask questions, but that's all I'll do. We have a free press." McCormack's Sudanese counterpart replied, "There is no freedom of the press here."

Reference to rural Virginia as "redneck" country
During an appearance on MSNBC on June 5, 2008, Mitchell referred to the voters of the southwest Virginia region as rednecks.  On June 9, she apologized on air, saying "I owe an apology to the good people of Bristol, Virginia, for something stupid that I said last week. I was trying to explain, based on reporting from Democratic strategists, why Barack Obama was campaigning in southwest Virginia, but without attribution or explanation, I used a term strategists often use to demean an entire community. No excuses, I'm really sorry."

Romney's remarks at Wawa
Having been led to believe that a clip showed that presidential candidate Mitt Romney was impressed by a touchscreen at a Wawa convenience store, Mitchell and contributor Chris Cillizza laughed when it was shown on Andrea Mitchell Reports, alluding to a widely held myth that George H. W. Bush was unfamiliar with a supermarket scanner in an incident during his 1992 campaign. She suggested this might be Romney's "supermarket scanner moment." She said, "I get the feeling that Mitt Romney has not been in too many Wawas along the roadside of Pennsylvania." The full clip puts his comments in the context of his claim that Wawa's "touchtone keypads" (touchscreens) show efficiency in the private sector compared to his statement that it took multiple filings of a 33-page government form for an optometrist to change his address.

Mitchell briefly addressed complaints from the Republican National Committee and Romney's campaign the following day. Introducing the full clip, Mitchell stated, "The RNC and the campaign both reached out to us, saying that Romney had more to say on that visit about federal bureaucracy and innovation in the private sector. We didn't get a chance to play that, so here it is now."

Warsaw Ghetto Uprising characterization
In February 2019, Mitchell characterized the Warsaw Ghetto Uprising as being against "the Polish and Nazi regimes." She apologized on Twitter for her comment. The Polish Institute of National Remembrance sued Mitchell in Polish court for alleging that Poland played a role in the Holocaust.

Personal life

She married her second husband, then Federal Reserve Chair Alan Greenspan, on April 6, 1997, following a lengthy relationship. Previously, she was married to Gil Jackson; that marriage ended in divorce in the mid-1970s.

On September 7, 2011, Mitchell revealed that she had been diagnosed with breast cancer during a doctor's visit a few weeks earlier. It was caught early and treated.

See also

 List of University of Pennsylvania people

References

External links

Andrea Mitchell Reports at MSNBC

Andrea Mitchell – University of Pennsylvania video
Membership at the Council on Foreign Relations

1946 births
Living people
American television reporters and correspondents
American political writers
American women television journalists
MSNBC people
NBC News people
Jewish American writers
Television anchors from Philadelphia
Journalists from Washington, D.C.
Television personalities from New Rochelle, New York
Writers from New York City
Writers from Washington, D.C.
20th-century American journalists
21st-century American journalists
20th-century American writers
21st-century American writers
20th-century American women writers
21st-century American women writers
Journalists from New York (state)
New Rochelle High School alumni